Parmulina is a genus of fungi in the family Parmulariaceae.

Species
Parmulina asterophora
Parmulina callista
Parmulina dimorphospora
Parmulina exsculpta
Parmulina japonica
Parmulina rehmii
Parmulina stenochlaenae
Parmulina stigmatopteridis
Parmulina uleana

References

External links
Parmulina at Index Fungorum

Parmulariaceae
Taxa named by Ferdinand Theissen
Taxa named by Hans Sydow
Dothideomycetes genera